Indian River is an unincorporated area in Prince County in the Canadian province of Prince Edward Island.

Communities in Prince County, Prince Edward Island